Shart: The Challenge is a 2004 Indian Hindi-language romantic drama film written and directed by Puri Jagannadh. This film stars Tusshar Kapoor, Gracy Singh, Amrita Arora, Prakash Raj, and Anupam Kher. It is a remake of his Telugu blockbuster film, Badri , which was one of the highest grossing movies of the year and achieved a cult status among youth.

Plot

Karan (Tusshar Kapoor) has a habit of involving himself in all types of challenges. While Karan and Sonam (Gracy Singh) go out singing and dancing, there comes a moment when an argument develops between them regarding love. Sonam believes in love at first sight while Karan opposes vehemently, stating that love at first sight is nothing but mere infatuation. Sonam challenges Karan to befriend and propose to a girl of her choice. If he succeeds, she will accept defeat and present Karan with a gift, which he has to accept. Karan accepts the challenge

Just then a beautiful girl steps down the temple stairs. Sonam notices her and  points at her as the target for their challenge. The girl is Saryu (Amrita Arora). Adopting different methods, Karan ultimately strikes a chord of friendship with Saryu. One day, Saryu’s brother Nanda sees them together. Nanda and his goons thrash, people shart black and blue if they dare to cast an evil eye on Saryu. He goes to Karan’s office with his henchmen. After a scuffle, Nanda warns Karan to stay away from his sister. Seeing their rough behavior, Sonam expresses her wish to withdraw her challenge. But Karan is now more determined to face Nanda at any cost.

Saryu learns about the confrontation and decides to reveal everything to her brother. While he is in a jolly mood, she confesses her love for Karan. Nanda gets enraged and disapproves of Karan. A depressed Saryu attempts suicide. Karan learns about the suicide attempt and runs to the hospital to meet her. But Nanda confronts him again. Nanda tells Saryu that Karan is in love with another girl, and they are planning to marry shortly. When Saryu questions Karan about it, he reveals the truth about the challenge with Sonam. Saryu feels betrayed. Sonam observes all this and tells Karan that he has won the challenge, for which her gift to him is Saryu’s hand in marriage.

Cast
 Tusshar Kapoor as Karan Kapoor
 Amrita Arora as Saryu
 Gracy Singh as Sonam
 Prakash Raj as Nandu
 Anupam Kher as Dr. Mathur
 Rajpal Yadav as Bhootnath

Soundtrack

References

External links
 

2004 films
2000s Hindi-language films
Indian romantic drama films
Films directed by Puri Jagannadh
Hindi remakes of Telugu films
Films scored by Anu Malik
2004 romantic drama films